General elections were held in Western Samoa on 23 January 1924.

Background
A Legislative Council was established by the Samoa Constitution Order 1920, which provided for an unelected body of at least four 'official' members (civil servants) and a number of nominated 'unofficial' members, who were not allowed to outnumber the official members. The first Legislative Council consisted of the Chief Judge, the Commissioner of the Crown Estates, the Secretary to the Administration, the Secretary of Native Affairs and the Treasurer, with Arthur Keeling, Fred E. Syddall and Alfred John Tattersall as the unofficial members. The Samoa Constitution Order 1920 was superseded by the Samoa Act 1921, although the membership of the Legislative Council remained unchanged until 1923, when an amendment (the Samoa Legislative Council (Elective Membership) Order 1923) increased the number of members to twelve, with six official members and six unofficial members, three of which were to be appointed and three of which were to be elected.

Electoral system
The franchise was restricted to European men aged 21 or over that owned property with a value of at least £200, or had an annual salary (in Samoa) of at least £200. The qualification criteria excluded a significant proportion of the European population from voting. A total of 214 voters were enrolled, 85% of whom were based in Apia.

Results
Nine candidates contested the elections. The three elected members were the merchants Olaf Frederick Nelson and George Westbrook, and the plumber Arthur Williams.

Apia
Results for Apia were published in the Samoanische Zeitung on 25 January.

Aftermath
On 2 February 1924 the Governor-General of New Zealand appointed the Chief Judge, the Collector of Customs, the Crown Solicitor, the Secretary to the Administration, the Secretary of Native Affairs and the Treasurer as the official members. The Collector of Customs was replaced by the Public Trustee at a later date.

References

Samoa
General
Elections in Samoa